New Utrecht Reformed Church is the fourth oldest Reformed Church in America congregation and is located in Bensonhurst, Brooklyn, New York. The church was established in 1677 by ethnic Dutch residents in the town of New Utrecht, Brooklyn, several years after the English took over New Netherland. It is affiliated with the Reformed Church in America, a Protestant denomination. The cemetery was consecrated in 1654; 1300 dead are interred there. The Liberty Pole, the sixth on the site of the present church, was originally erected in 1783 at the end of the Revolutionary War to harass departing British troops.

The present church was built in 1828 of stones taken from the original church, built in 1700. Construction was supervised by US Army engineer, Rene Edward De Russy, who led the construction of Fort Hamilton at New York harbor. The parish house was built in 1892 and the parsonage in 1906.

The church was designated as a National Historic Landmark in 1966; the parish house and the cemetery received landmark status in 1998. Both the church and the cemetery are listed in the National Register of Historic Places.



See also 
List of New York City Landmarks
National Register of Historic Places listings in Kings County, New York
 Reverend Johannes Arondeus

References

External links 
New Utrecht Reformed Church
Friends of Historic New Utrecht
 Includes photos of the interior.
New Utrecht Church, New York City Landmarks Commission 
New Utrecht Cemetery, New York City Landmarks Commission  
 New Utrecht Reformed Church, Historic Marker Database

Churches in Brooklyn
Dutch-American culture in New York City
1677 establishments in the Province of New York
Religious organizations established in the 1670s
17th-century Calvinist and Reformed churches
Properties of religious function on the National Register of Historic Places in Brooklyn
Reformed Church in America churches
Former Dutch Reformed churches in New York (state)
Churches completed in 1828
Bensonhurst, Brooklyn
New York City Designated Landmarks in Brooklyn